The 2021 MLS Expansion Draft was a special draft for the Major League Soccer expansion team Charlotte FC that was held on December 14, 2021. The list of exposed players was revealed on December 13, 2021. The picks were made on December 14, 2021 at 7:00 PM ET with Charlotte selecting McKinze Gaines, Anton Walkes, Joseph Mora, Tristan Blackmon, and Ismael Tajouri-Shradi.

Format
Teams who had players selected in the 2020 MLS Expansion Draft are exempt.  These teams are San Jose Earthquakes, New York Red Bulls, Nashville SC, LA Galaxy, and Orlando City SC.  All other teams from the 2021 season are subject to the draft.  These teams have 12 protection slots that they may apply to any draft eligible player on their senior, supplemental, and reserve rosters. Players who have not graduated from Generation Adidas, and homegrown players age 25 and under as of the end of the 2021 season are not eligible for the draft.  Players with contracts expiring at the end of the season, designated players, and players with no-trade clauses are part of a team's roster and are eligible for the draft.  In the case of player's with no-trade clauses, a team must use one of their protection slots for that player.  If a team has a players selected in the draft, that team becomes exempt from any further picks in the draft.  The expansion team, Charlotte FC was given 5 picks for the draft.

Expansion Draft picks

Team-by-team-breakdown

Atlanta United FC

Austin FC

Chicago Fire FC

FC Cincinnati

Colorado Rapids

Columbus Crew

D.C. United

FC Dallas

Houston Dynamo FC

Los Angeles FC

Inter Miami CF

Minnesota United FC

CF Montréal

New England Revolution

New York City FC

Philadelphia Union

Portland Timbers

Real Salt Lake

Seattle Sounders FC

Sporting Kansas City

Toronto FC

Vancouver Whitecaps FC

References

External links 
 2021 MLS Expansion Draft Rules

Major League Soccer Expansion Draft
Expansion
Charlotte FC
MLS Expansion Draft